The 2010–11 B-Meg Derby Ace Llamados season was the 23rd season of the franchise in the Philippine Basketball Association (PBA).

Key dates
August 29: The 2010 PBA Draft took place in Fort Bonifacio, Taguig.

Draft picks

Roster

Philippine Cup

Eliminations

Standings

Commissioner's Cup

Eliminations

Standings

Governors Cup

Eliminations

Standings

Semifinals

Standings

Transactions

Pre-season

Trades

Commissioner's Cup

Conditional dispersal draft
{| cellspacing="0"
| valign="top" |

Governors Cup

Recruited imports

References

Magnolia Hotshots seasons
B-meg